Christina Fay Miller  (born 8 April 1947) is a former Australian politician. She was the Country Liberal Party member for Katherine in the Northern Territory Legislative Assembly from 2003 to 2008.

|}

Miller was born in South Australia, moving to Katherine in 1989. In South Australia she had worked in clerical positions and in Katherine she was an office manager before she and her husband purchased Red Gum Tourist Park. In 2003 she was elected to the Assembly in a by-election following Mike Reed's resignation. She was deputy leader of the CLP for a period and served on the front bench. In 2006 she was involved in a car accident and sustained serious injuries, which was a contributing factor towards her retirement in 2008. In March 2012, she was elected the new mayor of Katherine.

In the 2021 Australia Day Honours Miller was appointed a Member of the Order of Australia for "significant service to local government, to tourism, and to the community of Katherine".

References

1947 births
Living people
Members of the Order of Australia
Members of the Northern Territory Legislative Assembly
Country Liberal Party members of the Northern Territory Legislative Assembly
21st-century Australian politicians
Women members of the Northern Territory Legislative Assembly
21st-century Australian women politicians